Luka Bešenić (born 12 July 1987) is a Croatian football goalkeeper who currently plays with NK Zelengaj Donji Kucan.

Club career 
Bešenić began his career in the 4. HNL with Sloboda Varaždin. Shortly after he was signed by NK Varteks in the Croatian First Football League, where he featured in ten matches. He had loan spells with NK Koprivnica, and Sloboda Varaždin. In 2010, he signed with NK Međimurje in the Croatian Second Football League. He also spent time n the 3. HNL with NK Vrbovec, and NK Podravina.

In 2013, he went abroad to play in the Slovenian PrvaLiga with NK Zavrč. In 2015, he went further abroad to play with Brantford Galaxy in the Canadian Soccer League. After two seasons in Canada he returned to the Croatian Third Football League to play with NK Međimurje, where he assisted in securing promotion. In 2018, he signed with NK Zelengaj Donji Kucan. He also had spells with two Austrian lower league clubs.

References

External links
PrvaLiga profile 

1987 births
Living people
Sportspeople from Varaždin
Association football goalkeepers
Croatian footballers
NK Varaždin players
NK Koprivnica players
NK Međimurje players
NK Vrbovec players
NK Zavrč players
Brantford Galaxy players
Croatian Football League players
First Football League (Croatia) players
Slovenian PrvaLiga players
Austrian Regionalliga players
Canadian Soccer League (1998–present) players
Croatian expatriate footballers
Expatriate footballers in Slovenia
Croatian expatriate sportspeople in Slovenia
Expatriate footballers in Austria
Croatian expatriate sportspeople in Austria
Expatriate soccer players in Canada
Croatian expatriate sportspeople in Canada